Lost Springs is a town in Converse County, Wyoming, United States. As of the 2020 census, the population was 6.

History
Lost Springs was first inhabited in the 1880s, when it received its name from railroad workers who could not find the springs shown on survey maps of the area. The town was incorporated in 1911, and it originally had 200 residents, most of whom worked at the nearby Rosin coal mine. After the coal mine closed around 1930, the population of Lost Springs steadily declined.

Edward John Sanmann of York, Nebraska, and his wife, Lauretta Mae (Rogers) of Bloomington, Nebraska, moved to Lost Springs in 1948 where they lived and worked in the general store and assisted with running the town's post office. Sanmann was a member of the American Sunday School Union and Bible Class at Shawnee. The couple had a daughter who died in infancy, Virginia Arlene, and an adopted daughter, Louise Marie. Sanmann and his wife died 17 days apart in September 1967.

By 1960, the population of the town had dropped to five. In 1976, both the state of Wyoming and the U.S. Bicentennial Commission designated Lost Springs as the smallest incorporated town in America; its population was then eleven.

In 1983, Lost Springs became involved in a court battle with the Chicago and North Western Transportation Company. The railroad, which ran adjacent to the town, attempted to seize  of land to build a  railway embankment. Lost Springs Mayor Leda Price alleged that the embankment, which would lie between the town and U.S. Highways 18 and 20, would separate the town from traffic on the highway. A Wyoming district judge ruled in the town's favor, and the railroad ultimately agreed to build an unobstructing track bed and use its own land for track.

Geography 
Lost Springs is located on the High Plains.

Climate
Lost Springs has a semi-arid climate under the Köppen Climate Classification. The town experiences cold, dry winters and warm, slightly wet summers.

Demographics

2010 census
As of the census of 2010, there were 4 people, 3 households, and 0 families residing in the town. The racial makeup of the town was 100.0% White.

There were 3 households, of which 100.0% were non-families. 66.7% of all households were made up of individuals. The average household size was 1.33.

The median age in the town was 59.5 years. 100% of residents were between the ages of 45 to 64. The gender makeup of the town was 50.0% male and 50.0% female.

2000 census
For the 2000 census, only one person resided in Lost Springs, Wyoming. According to the United States Census Bureau, the town is one of only four places in the United States to have a population of one person. Since 2000, the population of Monowi, Nebraska also fell to one. However, Lost Springs mayor Leda Price claims the census was inaccurate, and that Lost Springs had four residents in 2000. By 2009, the population had dropped to three. According to the 2010 Census, the population was four.

Education
There is no public education in Lost Springs because there are no children in Lost Springs. If the need arose for public education it would be provided by Converse County School District #1.

References

Towns in Converse County, Wyoming